Chinits (also, Chee-nitch and Tcheh-nits) is a former Karok settlement in Humboldt County, California. It was located below Tsofkara on the south bank of the Klamath River; its precise location is unknown.

References

Former settlements in Humboldt County, California
Former Native American populated places in California
Karuk villages
Lost Native American populated places in the United States